Magnoteuthis is a genus of whip-lash squid containing at least three species. Some teuthologists consider Idioteuthis or Mastigoteuthis synonymous with this taxon, but it is genetically and morphologically distinct.

Species
Genus Magnoteuthis
Magnoteuthis magna (Joubin, 1913)
Magnoteuthis microlucens (Young, Lindgren & Vecchione, 2008)
Magnoteuthis osheai Braid & Bolstad, 2015

References

External links
 

Squid
Cephalopod genera